Harry Hindemith (16 June 1906 – 21 January 1973) was a German actor. He appeared in more than eighty films from 1944 to 1973.

Filmography

References

External links 

1906 births
1973 deaths
German male film actors